Vesa Tapio Hietalahti (born 27 September 1969) is a Finnish former biathlete

Biathlon results
All results are sourced from the International Biathlon Union.

Olympic Games

*Pursuit was added as an event in 2002.

World Championships
1 medal (1 silver)

*During Olympic seasons competitions are only held for those events not included in the Olympic program.
**Team was removed as an event in 1998, and pursuit was added in 1997 with mass start being added in 1999 and the mixed relay in 2005.

Individual victories
3 victories (2 In, 1 MS)

*Results are from UIPMB and IBU races which include the Biathlon World Cup, Biathlon World Championships and the Winter Olympic Games.

References

External links
 
 

1969 births
Living people
People from Kauhajoki
Finnish male biathletes
Biathletes at the 1992 Winter Olympics
Biathletes at the 1994 Winter Olympics
Biathletes at the 1998 Winter Olympics
Biathletes at the 2002 Winter Olympics
Olympic biathletes of Finland
Biathlon World Championships medalists
Sportspeople from South Ostrobothnia